Kidsguide is a bi-annual magazine serving families in the southern Los Angeles and western Orange County areas. The magazine provides editorial content and directory information for several thousand services for children, families and communities. Kidsguide can be found at public libraries, YMCAs, Boys and Girls Clubs, Girl/Boy Scout Offices, and various child-friendly establishments throughout the service areas. Kidsguide also offers a summer publication called the "Kidsguide Calendar" and weekly e-letter called "The Buzz."

History 
Kidsguide was founded in 1986 by Liz Davis, a Long Beach-based mother with two children. Since then, the magazine has grown to serve an audience of more than half a million annually. The magazine has a sister publication called Petsguide.

Illustrators
Kidsguide has a tradition of custom covers created by famous illustrators. Such illustrators have included Mort Drucker (Mad Magazine), Jack Davis  (The Zack Files, Marsupial Sue), David Catrow (Stand Tall Molly Lou Mellon) and Brian Biggs (illustrator for MOMA's children's web site).

References

External links
 Kidsguide

Biannual magazines published in the United States
Children's magazines published in the United States
Magazines established in 1986
Magazines published in California
Mass media in Orange County, California
Parenting magazines